Kalopsida is a village in the Famagusta District of Cyprus,  east of Lysi. It is under the de facto control of Northern Cyprus.

Before 1974, Kalopsida was an exclusively Greek Cypriot village; its residents were displaced during the Turkish invasion of Cyprus. In 1973, 1,023 Greek Cypriots lived in Kalopsida. Presently, it is inhabited by displaced Turkish Cypriots from the south and some families from Turkey. It was renamed  in Turkish in 1975;  is the Turkish name of Paramali, which is where many of the Turkish Cypriots who now live in Kalopsida originate from.

Kalopsidiotes (pronounced ; residents of Kalopsida) were known for being very brave and constantly carrying knives, which they regarded as a symbol of pride.

The village has a football club (Çayönü) in Northern Cyprus K-Pet 2nd League.

References

Populated places in Gazimağusa District
Communities in Famagusta District